The Division of Namadgi was an Australian Electoral Division in the Australian Capital Territory. It was located in the southern suburbs of Canberra, and included all suburbs in the district of Tuggeranong, the southern Woden Valley suburbs of Chifley, Farrer, Isaacs, Mawson, Pearce and Torrens, and the remainder of the ACT south and west of the Murrumbidgee River.

The Division was proclaimed at the redistribution of 20 September 1994, and was first contested at the 1996 federal election. It was abolished at the redistribution of 10 December 1997. It was held for its entire lifetime by former ACT MLA Annette Ellis, who subsequently became the member for Canberra after Namadgi's abolition.

Members

Election results

1996 

Brendan Smyth was the sitting member for Canberra, having won the seat at the 1995 by-election.

References

Namadgi